Hancock County is a county in the U.S. state of Indiana.  The 2020 United States Census recorded a population of 79,840. The county seat is Greenfield.

Hancock County is included in the Indianapolis-Carmel-Anderson, IN Metropolitan Statistical Area

Geography
The terrain of Hancock County is low rolling hills, sloping to the south and southwest, carved by drainages. All available area is devoted to agriculture or urban development. The highest point is a small prominence in NW Shirley, at 1,040' (317m) ASL.

Adjacent counties

 Madison County - north
 Henry County - east
 Rush County - southeast
 Shelby County - south
 Marion County - west
 Hamilton County - northwest

Major highways

  Interstate 70
  U.S. Route 36
  U.S. Route 40
  U.S. Route 52
  State Road 9
  State Road 13
  State Road 67
  State Road 109
  State Road 234
  State Road 238

Airport
 KMQJ - Indianapolis Regional Airport

History
Indiana was admitted as a state to the United States on 11 December 1816, although much of its territory was still disputed or held by native peoples at that time. These indigenous claims were quickly reduced and removed by various treaties. The 1818 Treaty with the Delaware Indians brought most of central Indiana into state control, and Madison County was organized on a portion of that area. The lower portion of Madison County was quickly settled, and by the late 1820s the inhabitants were petitioning for a separate county government. Accordingly, a portion of the county was partitioned on 1 March 1828, to form Hancock County. Greenfield was named as the county seat on 11 April. The county name recognized John Hancock, president of the Continental Congress, who had signed his name prominently to the Declaration of Independence in 1776. The county has retained its original borders since its 1828 creation.

Climate and weather

Government

The county government is a constitutional body, and is granted specific powers by the Constitution of Indiana, and by the Indiana Code.

County Council: The legislative branch of the county government; controls the county's spending and revenue collection. Representatives are elected from county districts. The council members serve staggered four-year terms. They are responsible for setting salaries, the annual budget, and special spending. The council also has limited authority to impose local taxes, in the form of an income and property tax that is subject to state level approval, excise taxes, and service taxes.

Board of Commissioners: The executive body of the county. The commissioners are elected county-wide, in staggered four-year terms. One commissioner serves as president. The commissioners carry out the acts legislated by the council, collecting revenue, and managing the day-to-day functions of the county government.

Court: The county maintains a small claims court that can handle some civil cases. The judge on the court is elected to a term of four years and must be a member of the Indiana Bar Association. The judge is assisted by a constable who is also elected to a four-year term. In some cases, court decisions can be appealed to the state level circuit court.

County Officials: The county has several other elected offices, including sheriff, coroner, auditor, treasurer, recorder, surveyor, and circuit court clerk. They are elected to four-year terms. Members elected to county government positions are required to declare party affiliations and to be residents of the county.

Hancock County is part of Indiana's 5th congressional district; Indiana Senate district 28; and Indiana House of Representatives districts 29 and 53.

Public health and law enforcement 
On February 19, 2020, it was announced that Hancock County Prosecutor Brent Eaton intends to prosecute victims of drug overdoses with felony drug possession charges. To do so, his plan is to use the administration of Narcan (an overdose-reversal nasal spray) by a police officer as probable cause for search warrants requiring the overdose victim to provide an oral swab for law enforcement to aid in the county's prosecution of the victim for felony drug possession charges. In fact, Eaton created a one-page Hancock County Overdose Report form for officers to fill out when they turn in an affidavit for a search warrant.

Education
Hancock County is served by two library systems, the Fortville-Vernon Township Public Library and Hancock County Public Library.

The county's school districts include:

 Eastern Hancock County Community School Corporation
 Greenfield-Central Community Schools
 Mount Vernon Community School Corporation
 Southern Hancock County Community School Corporation

Demographics

2020 census

As of the 2020 United States Census the population of Hancock County was 79,840.

2010 Census
As of the 2010 United States Census, there were 70,002 people, 26,304 households, and 19,792 families in the county. The racial makeup of the county was 95.2% white, 2.1% black or African American, 0.8% Asian, 0.2% American Indian, 0.4% from other races, and 1.2% from two or more races. Those of Hispanic or Latino origin made up 1.7% of the population. In terms of ancestry, 26.2% were German, 13.9% were Irish, 11.8% were English, and 11.8% were American.

Of the 26,304 households, 37.2% had children under the age of 18 living with them, 61.0% were married couples living together, 9.8% had a female householder with no husband present, 24.8% were non-families, and 20.3% of all households were made up of individuals. The average household size was 2.64 and the average family size was 3.03. The median age was 39.1 years.

The median income for a household in the county was $47,697 and the median income for a family was $69,734. Males had a median income of $53,565 versus $38,042 for females. The per capita income for the county was $28,017. About 5.9% of families and 7.3% of the population were below the poverty line, including 8.0% of those under age 18 and 5.2% of those age 65 or over.

Cities and towns

 Cumberland (extends into Marion County)
 Fortville
 Greenfield
 McCordsville
 New Palestine
 Shirley (extends into Henry County)
 Spring Lake
 Wilkinson

Townships

 Blue River
 Brandywine
 Brown
 Buck Creek
 Center
 Green
 Jackson
 Sugar Creek
 Vernon

Unincorporated communities

 Carrollton
 Charlottesville (extends into Rush County)
 Cleveland
 Eden
 Finly (also known as Carrollton)
 Gem
 Maxwell
 Milners Corner
 Mohawk
 Mount Comfort
 Nashville
 Philadelphia
 Pleasant Acres
 Riley
 Stringtown
 Warrington
 Westland
 Willow Branch
 Woodbury

See also
 Daily Reporter, daily newspaper covering Hancock County (published in Greenfield)
 Edward E. Moore, Indiana state senator and Los Angeles City Council member
 National Register of Historic Places listings in Hancock County, Indiana

References

External links
 Hancock County Official Website

 
Indiana counties
1828 establishments in Indiana
Populated places established in 1828
Indianapolis metropolitan area